Beijing Review, previously Peking Review, is China's only national news magazine in English, published by the Chinese Communist Party-owned China International Publishing Group. In 2006 it claimed a per-issue circulation of 70,000 and distribution "throughout China and 150 countries and regions worldwide."

Beijing Review has two overseas branches: the North America Bureau in New York, U.S.A., and the CHINAFRICA Media and Publishing (Pty) Ltd in Johannesburg, South Africa. In addition to the English print edition, Beijing Review also publishes online editions in Chinese, English, French, German and Japanese.

Overview
Founded in March 1958 as the weekly Peking Review, it was an important tool for the Chinese government to communicate to the rest of world. The first issue included an editor's note explaining that the magazine was meant to "provide timely, accurate, first-hand information on economic, political and cultural developments in China, and her relations with the rest of the world." The U.S. Postal Service initially restricted distribution of the magazine but the U.S. Supreme Court overturned this policy in Lamont v. Postmaster General. In 1967 the Chinese authorities sent several issues of the magazine, then titled Peking Review, to East Germany.

In early 2020, Beijing Review ran advertorials in The Economist praising the Chinese government response to COVID-19.

In October 2020, the United States Department of State designated Beijing Review as a "foreign mission" of China.

References

External links
 
 Collection of historical issues of Peking Review
 

1958 establishments in China
News magazines published in Asia
Political magazines published in China
Weekly magazines published in China
Communist magazines
Magazines established in 1958
Magazines published in Beijing
Multilingual magazines
Online magazines
Weekly news magazines
State media